Herbert William Smith was a footballer who played for Port Vale in the English Football League between 1925 and 1929.

Career
Smith joined Port Vale from Littleworth in August 1925. He featured in eight Second Division matches in 1925–26. He appeared 16 times at The Old Recreation Ground in 1926–27. He was again a covering player in the 1927–28 campaign, making 16 appearances. He played 24 times in 1928–29, but the club was relegated into the Third Division North, and Smith was released. He later played for non-league side Stafford Rangers.

Career statistics
Source:

References

Sportspeople from Stafford
English footballers
Association football wing halves
Port Vale F.C. players
Stafford Rangers F.C. players
English Football League players
Year of birth missing
Year of death missing